Ramin is a 2011 Lithuanian documentary film directed by Audrius Stonys about the Georgian wrestler Ramin Lomsadze, who once won seven matches in 55 seconds. The film was selected as the Lithuanian entry for the Best Foreign Language Oscar at the 85th Academy Awards, but it did not make the final shortlist.

See also
 List of submissions to the 85th Academy Awards for Best Foreign Language Film
 List of Lithuanian submissions for the Academy Award for Best Foreign Language Film

References

External links
 

2011 films
2011 documentary films
Documentary films about sportspeople
Lithuanian documentary films
2010s Georgian-language films